First Baptist Church Woodstock is a Baptist megachurch in the northwestern Atlanta suburb of Woodstock, Georgia. It is affiliated with the Southern Baptist Convention. The lead pastor is Jeremy Morton.

History 
It was founded in 1837 as the Enon Church.

In 1879, Enon Baptist Church moved to Downtown Woodstock.

In 1884, the name was changed to Woodstock Baptist Church.

In 1913, the sanctuary burned and replaced with the building that currently stands in Downtown Woodstock.

In 1986, Johnny M. Hunt, former Southern Baptist Convention President, became senior pastor. The attendance was 1,027 members.

In 1991, First Baptist Woodstock moved to a new 2,400 seat sanctuary on Neese Road.

In 2005, First Baptist Woodstock's new 7,000 seat Worship Center opened.

In 2019, Pastor Hunt announced a transition where he would step down from his role at FBCW, and Jeremy Morton would assume the Senior Pastor position. Both Johnny Hunt and Jeremy Morton lead as co-pastors during the majority of 2019. The transition was completed in December 2019.

Ministries 
Clothes closet and food pantry.

See also
 List of the largest churches in the USA

References

References

External links
 

Evangelical megachurches in the United States
Megachurches in Georgia
Baptist churches in Georgia (U.S. state)
Religious organizations established in 1837
1837 establishments in Georgia (U.S. state)
Southern Baptist Convention churches